Béchervaise Island is the largest of the Flat Islands, located just west of Stinear Island in Holme Bay, Mac. Robertson Land. It is one of several plotted as a part of "Flatøy" ("Flat Island") by Norwegian cartographers from air photos taken by the 1936–37 Lars Christensen Expedition, but was found to be a separate island by the Australian National Antarctic Research Expeditions in 1954 and named for John Béchervaise, officer in charge at Mawson Station in 1955 and 1959.

See also 
 Composite Antarctic Gazetteer
 List of Antarctic islands south of 60° S 
 Scientific Committee on Antarctic Research
 Territorial claims in Antarctica

References
 

Islands of Mac. Robertson Land